Boris Variations is a compilation of previously recorded and re-recorded audio music, as well as live video music by  Japanese band, Boris. The CD comprises selections from six Boris full-length releases that generally keep to their 'heavy rock' style, as well as one single B-side ("Floor Shaker" is from the "Statement" single). Five of the 13 songs have been re-recorded.  Production credits on the CD are for Boris. Besides the three regular members of the band - Takeshi, Wata and Atsuo - Michio Kurihara also plays guitar on tracks 2, 6, 7, 9, 11 and 12. All songs are composed by Boris, except for track 6, which is by Boris and Michio Kurihara.

The DVD is composed of 14 songs and is titled "Live in Japan" on the menu page.  The first 11 tracks were recorded on December 14, 2008, and follow the track list set down by the band on their Smile -Live at Wolf Creek- recording and tour at the end of the band's Smile world tour at Daikanyama Unit in Tokyo.  The last three songs were recorded December 12, 2009 at Club Citta' in Tokyo. Besides the three regular members of the band - Takeshi, Wata and Atsuo - Michio Kurihara plays guitar on all recordings.  Song credits on the DVD are all for Boris except for track 1, which is by PYG, track 7, which is by Boris and Michio Kurihara, and track 10, which is by Ai Aso and Boris.  The video is directed by fangsanalsatan and Ryuta Muruyama.

The package comes with a 24-page booklet, which has a front and back cover; of the 22 inside pages, all but two (one for each disc) are blank.

Curiously, while the length of the opening introduction track from Akuma no Uta is identical to the original introduction of the Japanese CD, the audio is actually an edit of the 9 minute introduction used for the US pressing of the album. As well, this compilation marks yet another distinct version of the song "a bao a qu," which also has other studio recordings on previous albums Sound Track from Film "Mabuta no Ura", The Thing Which Solomon Overlooked, and the version used on both the a bao a qu 7" and the DVD heavy metal me.

Track listing

Variations CD

DVD
 "花　太陽　雨 - Flower Sun Rain" - 8:06
 "Buzz In" - 3:01
 "放て! - Laser In" - 4:35
 "Pink" - 4:28
 "メッセージ - Statement" - 4:28
 "Floor Shaker" - 6:09
 "虹が始まるとき - Rainbow" - 5:29
 "となりのサターン - My Neighbor Satan" - 6:49
 "枯れ果てた先 - No One Grieves" - 9:05
 "君は傘をさしていた - You were Holding an Umbrella" - 14:14
"[ ]" - 26:50
 "トーキヨーワンダーランド - Tokyo Wonder Land" - 5:37
 "a bao a qu" - 3:48
 "決別 - Farewell" - 7:55

References

External links
 Boris official site
 Variations official record label site
 Label's band site

Boris (band) live albums
Live album series
2010 live albums
2010 compilation albums